Jean Baptiste Lutz (born January 12, 1988) is a French sprint canoeist who has competed since the late 2000s. He won a bronze medal in the K-1 4 x 200 m event at the 2009 ICF Canoe Sprint World Championships in Dartmouth.

References
 Canoe09.ca profile

1988 births
French male canoeists
Living people
ICF Canoe Sprint World Championships medalists in kayak